The 2003 Fed Cup was the 41st edition of the most important competition between national teams in women's tennis.

The final took place at the Olympic Stadium in Moscow, Russia on 22–23 November. France defeated the United States, giving France their second title.

World Group

Draw

World Group play-offs

Date: 19–20 July

The eight losing teams in the World Group first round ties and eight winners of the Zonal Group I sections competed in the World Group play-offs for spots in the 2004 World Group.

Americas Zone

 Nations in bold advanced to the higher level of competition.
 Nations in italics were relegated down to a lower level of competition.

Group I
Venue: Campinas, Brazil (outdoor clay)

Dates: 23–26 April

Participating Teams

Group II
Venue: San Juan, Puerto Rico (outdoor hard)

Dates: 23–27 April

Participating Teams

Asia/Oceania Zone

 Nations in bold advanced to the higher level of competition.
 Nations in italics were relegated down to a lower level of competition.

Group I
Venue: Tokyo, Japan (outdoor hard)

Dates: 21–25 April

Participating Teams

Group II
Venue: Tokyo, Japan (outdoor hard)

Dates: 21–24 April

Participating Teams

 
 
 Pacific Oceania

Europe/Africa Zone

 Nations in bold advanced to the higher level of competition.
 Nations in italics were relegated down to a lower level of competition.

Group I
Venue: Estoril, Portugal (outdoor clay)

Dates: 21–26 April

Participating Teams

Group II
Venue: Estoril, Portugal (outdoor clay)

Dates: 28 April – 3 May

Participating Teams

Rankings
The rankings were measured after the three points during the year that play took place, and were collated by combining points earned from the previous four years.

References

External links
 Fed Cup

 
Billie Jean King Cups by year
Fed
2003 in women's tennis